John T. Costin was a Republican Party organizer, a member of the Georgia Legislature, and a minister in Georgia, United States, during the Reconstruction Era (1863 or 1865 - 1877). Costin helped form the Republican Party of Georgia  He met with U.S. President Abraham Lincoln. Costin was a freemason and held the title of Grand Master (Masonic). Costin was described as a scion of one of Washington's most illustrious families.

Costin was born in Virginia.

References

19th-century American politicians

Year of birth missing
Year of death missing
African-American politicians during the Reconstruction Era
American Freemasons
Original 33
African-American state legislators in Georgia (U.S. state)
People from Virginia
Georgia (U.S. state) Republicans